Gurban may refer to
Gurban (given name)
Gurban (river) in Romania
Sana gurban, an Azerbaijani composition by Alekper Taghiyev